Astorga is a municipality and city of Spain located in the central area of the province of León, in the autonomous community of Castilla y León,  southwest of the provincial capital. It is located in the transit between the Páramo Leonés and the mountains of León and acts as the backbone of the comarcas of Maragatería, La Cepeda and the Ribera del Órbigo. The city is the head of one of the most extensive and oldest dioceses of Spain, whose jurisdiction covers half of the province of León and part of Ourense and Zamora. It is also head of the judicial party number 5 of the province of León.

Astorga lies in the area of the Maragatos, a small ethnic and cultural community with distinctive customs and architecture. The town lies at the junction of the French route, the most popular path and Vía de la Plata route, an alternative path of the Way of St. James.  Saint Turibius of Astorga was bishop of the city in the 5th century.

History 

The timeline of Galician history that includes Astorga has artifactual evidence stretching back over 200,000 years, predating the Paleolithic.  away from Astorga in the Atapuerca Mountains (Sierra de Atapuerca) exists a rich fossil record of the earliest humans in Spain. The scientific study of these remains provide priceless information about the appearance and the way these humans lived. The regional government of Castile and León has designated the site an Espacio cultural.

Tin artifacts dated to c. 2750 BC using metallurgical diffusion chronologic dating were found in the area of Astorga. Artifacts such as tube and double ring axes were located in Astorga and are significant to an Atlantic cultural complex from the Bronze Age period c. 1300–700 BC that are included in the Castro cultures.

 Astorga, in the Iron Age, came under the cultural influence of the Celts; the local Celtic peoples inhabited the area around 275 BC, known as the Astures and the Cantabri. Later become one of the Roman strongholds in the region they called Asturica.
 During Cantabrian wars (28-19 BC), Roman legions VI Victrix (Sixth Victorious Legion) and  X Gemina (Tenth Twin Legion) were sent and established a castra on the Leonesian land. The castra was important because of Astures revolutions (22 BC) and proximity to gold mines of Las Medulas.
 After the Punic Wars in 146 BC, the Romans turned their attention to conquering Hispania. The tribe of the Gallaeci 60,000 strong, according to Paulus Orosius, faced the Roman forces led by Decimus Junius Brutus Callaicus in 137 BC in a battle at the River Douro.  From this time, Gallaic fighters joined the Roman legions, to serve as far away as Dacia and Britain. The final extinction of Celtic resistance was the aim of the violent and ruthless Cantabrian Wars fought under the Emperor Augustus from 28 to 19 BC.
 The Roman city was founded in 14 BC, being entitled by Emperor Octavian as Asturica Augusta now known as Astorga.  It became an important administrative and military centre.  The Roman walls were rebuilt by Bishop Nuño around 1242 and they underwent several repairs during the Middle Ages. The city had thermal baths with hot, warm, cold water systems, sauna's and two main sewer system still in use today. Ruins of Roman baths are still visible today.
 In 35 AD as mining plans developed, this Roman Hispania castra was redesigned and built with the help of the army, into a city. A provincial capital, and the meeting-place of four military roads. Vía de la Plata (Silver Way) or Ruta de la Plata (Silver Route) is an ancient commercial and pilgrimage path that connects Astorga to Mérida. It was conceived and built as a trade route for the exploitation of gold. The Roman causeway allowed the Romans to conquer tribes such as the Callaici, the Astures, and the Vacceos. Pliny the Elder in 73 AD spoke of Vía de la Plata.
 Asturica was the main city in northwest Spain during the Roman Empire. Plinius Roman author, naturalist, and natural philosopher, as well as naval and army commander called the city Urbs magnifica ("magnificent city"). The Via Platea went from Asturica (Astorga) to Emerita (Mérida). One of the first three bishoprics in Spain was founded in Astorga, known as the Roman Catholic Diocese of Astorga. The title of Bishop of Astorga is one of the oldest religious charges of Europe.
 Astorga was sacked by the Visigothic King Theodoric II sometime during time of his rule. On 5 October 456, at the Battle at the Campus Paramus,  from Astorga on the Urbicus (Órbigo), Theoderic II, Eighth Visigoth King from 453 to 466 AD, lead an army into Spain and defeated Rechiar, Suebic King of Galicia from 488 to 12/456. During the waves of invasion of the peninsula by the Germanic tribes, one bishop was the noted Turibius. He documented the conversion of the Suebic King Remismund to Arianism, and worked to restore the churches destroyed by the Visigoths. The bishop was able to travel to Rome, from which he brought back what is believed to be a relic of the True Cross, for which he founded the Monastery of Santo Toribio de Liébana, where it is still preserved. Because Romans had control of the city, Christianity became very popular in this area during the early church. There is a legend that St. James (Santiago) and St. Paul both preached in Astorga and there is proof that there was a bishopric around the 3rd century. At the very beginning of Leo I's pontificate, in the years 444-447, Turibius, the bishop of Astorga in León, sent to Rome a memorandum warning that Priscillianism was by no means dead, reporting that it numbered even bishops among its supporters, and asking the aid of the Roman See. The distance was insurmountable in the 5th century. Germanic tribes, the Visigoths, took control over Astorga and destroyed the Roman city. However, it prospered with the help of Saints Turibius, Fructuosus, and Valerius.
 After the Berbers' withdrawal to join the blazing Berber rebellion (739-742) and the campaigns of Alfonso I of Asturias (742-757) against the Andalusians, the city was abandoned, being in the largely empty buffer zone between Moors and Christians known at the time as "The Desert of the Duero," and was part of the Repoblación ("repopulation") effort carried out a century later during the reign of Ordoño I of Asturias (850-866). Astorga suffered from decadence until the 11th century, when the city became a major stop on the French route for the pilgrims to the tomb of Saint James in Santiago de Compostela. Construction of the cathedral began in the 15th century and finished in the late 18th century.
 Jews were living in the fortified section of Astorga as early as the 11th century. Later they inhabited two quarters in the city. A street called the Garden (Paseo) of the Synagogue formerly ran beside the old city wall. Many Jews in Astorga were forcibly converted to Christianity in 1230–31. Although there is no record of the fate of the Jews of Astorga during the 1391 massacres, they suffered in the persecutions of 1412. At the synod held in Valladolid in 1432, the Astorga community claimed privileges exempting them from payment of crown taxes. The community existed until the expulsion of the Jews from Spain in 1492. Jews established their trades in the city. To this day, Astorga is the home of value-adding and special products.
 In 1528 Hernán Cortés brought Mexican Cacao bean to Spain. In the museum of chocolate in Astorga, 16th-century hot chocolate mugs are displayed. Astorga is the European birthplace of chocolate. One sees Astorga chocolate all over the region. The Marquisate of Astorga, the Diocese and the Maragato muleteers made Astorga a pioneer in the elaboration of chocolate from the 17th century. In 1914 there were 49 chocolate manufacturers in town.
 In 1747 Antonio Martín's book contains the recipe Mantecadas de Astorga (a mantecada is a muffin-sized cake similar to pound cake French madeleine cakes). The European Union designated them an historically and geographically significant part of Spanish cuisine. References indicating that the recipe originated with a nun from the Holy Spirit Convent in Astorga, who later left the convent and popularized the product. In the Official Journal of the European Union UNE-EN 45011 Regulatory Board, through the Certification Committee, established standards for Mantecadas de Astorga. Astorga's Chamber of Commerce reports the amount of mantecadas de Astorga carried by the Spanish railways in 1930 (the Spanish Northern and Western railway company) was 208 tons. A high percentage of the product is sold to tourists along with the well known Hojaldres de Astorga (puff pastry of Astorga).
 During the Peninsular War, Astorga was besieged by the French Napoleonic troops. Astorga was the farthest town in the Iberian Peninsula in which the Emperor Napoleon resided. The Siege of Astorga in 21 March - 22 April 1810 was an attempt by French forces to capture Astorga, Spain, in a campaign of the Peninsular War. Astorga was located on the flank of the French invasion of Spain and Portugal, and was meant to be used as a headquarters during the campaign.
 Because of its location, Astorga was a place for pilgrims to rest and get ready to climb the mountains in the west or to rejuvenate after climbing east. Astorga had 21 hospices. Today, there is the Hospital de las Hermana de la Caridad which is a medical facility in front of the cathedral that was built after the destruction of the 12th-century hospital that was consequently destroyed in 1756.
 Camino de Santiago ("St. James's Way") is a  pilgrimage to the cathedral in Santiago de Compostela where the remains of the apostle Saint James are buried. This has been the third-largest pilgrimage in Christianity for more than 1,000 years, and it comprises a stop in Astorga. The movie The Way is an inspirational film of 2010 starring Martin Sheen and Emilio Estevez walking the Camino de Santiago.
 During the second half of the 19th century, Astorga enjoyed the arrival of the railway and development of the current city, which expands outside its Roman walls. Astorga is again the nexus of a significant network of road connections, and it recovered the social and economical vibrancy, which has tourism as one of its main focal points.

Attractions
 Catedral de Santa María de Astorga
 19th-century Episcopal Palace (Palacio Espiscopal), designed by Antoni Gaudí.
 Town Hall, construction started in 1683. It is a Baroque edifice with three towers in its façade, the middle one including the bells.
 Roman archaeological remains, including those of the original military camp, the sewers, two baths (late 1st and 3rd century AD), remains of the forum and several mosaics.
 Roman museum ("La Ergastula").
 Remains of the ancient city walls.
 Chocolate museum.

Events
 Last week in August: Festividad de Santa Marta includes bullfights & fireworks.

Notable people
 Miguel Arias Bardou (1841–1915) - painter

Twin towns
  Moissac, France
  Clavijo, Spain
  Braga, Portugal
  Reus, Spain

See also 
 Kingdom of León
 La Maragatería

References

External links 
 
 
 Fundacion nombres y armas de la ciudad de Astorga (1635)
 Astorga travel guide
 Ayuntamiento de Astorga Astorga municipal government website 
 Maragateria Page

 
Municipalities in the Province of León
Maragatería
Astures
Roman fortifications in Hispania Tarraconensis
Cultural tourism in Spain